The Lagonda 2.6-Litre was an automobile produced in England  by Lagonda from 1948 to 1953. It was the first model from that company following its purchase by David Brown in 1947, and was named for the new straight-6 engine which debuted with the car. The Lagonda straight-6 engine was designed by W. O. Bentley and would propel Lagonda's new parent company, Aston Martin, to fame.

The 2.6-Litre (105 bhp) was a larger car than the Aston Martin models which were being produced under David Brown's ownership and was available as a 4-door saloon and, from 1949, as 2-door drophead coupé, both with 4 seats. The drophead was bodied by Tickford, at the time not part of Aston Martin. A Mark II version appeared in 1952, in saloon form only, with engine power increased to 125 bhp.

The car sold reasonably well, in spite of being an expensive car and being launched so soon after the war, with 510 examples made when production ended in 1953.

The car had a separate chassis and all independent suspension using coil springs at the front and torsion bars at the rear. At introduction it was believed to be the only all-independently sprung British car. Rack and pinion steering was used.

The test car cost £3,420 including taxes.

Gallery

References

External links

 The Classic DB Lagonda – a web-site exclusive to these DB 2.6 Lagondas

2.6-Litre
1940s cars
1950s cars
Cars introduced in 1948